Izzy Gets the F*ck Across Town is a 2017 American comedy-drama film written and directed by Christian Papierniak. The film stars Mackenzie Davis as a woman at rock bottom who must find her way across Los Angeles in order to crash her ex-boyfriend's engagement party. The film had its world premiere at the Los Angeles Film Festival on June 17, 2017. It was theatrically released in the United States by Shout! Studios on June 22, 2018.

Cast
 Mackenzie Davis as Izzy
 Ryan Simpkins as Young Izzy
 Carrie Coon as Virginia
 Alex Russell as Roger
 Alia Shawkat as Agatha Benson
 Lauren Miller Rogen as Ellen Wexler
 Haley Joel Osment as Walt
 Annie Potts as Mary 
 Lakeith Stanfield as George
 Melinda McGraw as Mrs. Percy
 Brandon T. Jackson as Dick
 Rob Huebel as Bennett
 Meghan Lennox as Casey
 Luka Jones as Leo
 Sarah Goldberg as Whitney
 Kyle Kinane as Rabbit
 Salme Geransar as Gypsy
 Matt Riker as Andy Wexler

Release
In November 2017, Shout! Studios acquired distribution rights to the film.

Soundtrack

The soundtrack for the film was nominated at the 2019 Guild of Music Supervisors Awards for "Best Film Budgeted Under 5 Million Dollars".

Reception
On review aggregator website Rotten Tomatoes, the film holds an approval rating of 56% based on 39 reviews, with an average rating of 5.8/10 and the critics' consensus that it "has all the restless energy viewers might expect given the title, but it's only sporadically channeled into a meaningful story." On Metacritic, the film has a weighted average score of 51 out of 100, based on 18 critics, indicating "mixed or average reviews".

Awards

The film won the award for Best Narrative Feature at the 2017 Tacoma Film Festival, where Davis was also awarded Best Actor. Davis won Best Breakout Performance at that year's Napa Valley Film Festival. In 2018, the screenplay for the film was permanently added to the Core Collection at the Academy of Motion Picture Arts and Sciences' Margaret Herrick Library.

References

External links
 
 

2017 films
2017 comedy-drama films
American comedy-drama films
American independent films
2017 independent films
Films set in Los Angeles
2010s English-language films
2010s American films